Great Horwood is a small village and is also a civil parish within the unitary authority area of Buckinghamshire, England with a population of about 1025 people (2001 Census). It is about five miles ESE of Buckingham, six miles WSW of Milton Keynes.

History and locale 
The village name 'Horwood' is Anglo Saxon in origin, and means 'muddy wood'.  The affix 'Great' was added later to differentiate it from the adjacent village Little Horwood.  In the Anglo-Saxon Chronicle in 792 the village was recorded as Horwudu.

The village was from ancient times on the periphery of the Whaddon Chase: royal hunting land that stretched across the north part of the Aylesbury Vale.  In 1447 the village was granted Royal charter to hold a weekly market, thus becoming a market town.  The rents from the market were collected by New College, Oxford. Great Horwood is no longer a market town.  In 1996, the lordship of the manor of Great Horwood was sold by New College to D. Jackson "Jack" Smith, an American lawyer and former member of the Tennessee House of Representatives.

A hamlet within the parish border of Great Horwood is Singleborough.

Notable buildings 
Both Great Horwood village itself and Singleborough have Conservation Areas and there are 46 Grade II listed buildings in the Parish. Great Horwood has two historic pubs: The Crown is situated on the village green and The Swan Inn on Winslow Road. As of January 2019 both pubs are no longer open to the public.

The parish church is dedicated to St James.

The village is also home to Great Horwood Church of England Combined School, which is a mixed Church of England primary school. It is a voluntary controlled school, which takes children from the age of four through to the age of eleven. The school has approximately 160 pupils. Its catchment area also includes the villages of Thornborough, Nash, Beachampton and Whaddon.

Pictures

References

External links

Great Horwood Church of England Combined School
Great Horwood Football Club
 

Villages in Buckinghamshire
Civil parishes in Buckinghamshire